Chehel Konar may refer to:
 Chehel Konar, Khuzestan
 Chehel Konar, Sistan and Baluchestan